This is the order of battle for the Battle of Timor (1942–43) which occurred on the island of Timor, in the Pacific theatre of World War II. It involved forces from the Empire of Japan—which invaded on February 20, 1942—on one side and Allied personnel, predominantly from Australia and the Netherlands, on the other. Many Timorese civilians and some Portuguese colonists fought with the Allies as criados (guerrillas), or provided food, shelter and other assistance.

Initial order of battle

Portugal

Portuguese Colonial Army units
HQ Timor (Repartição Militar de Timor)
Native Rifle Company (Companhia de Caçadores Indígenas)
Oecussi detachment of the Native Rifle Company
Border Cavalry Platoon

Portuguese civil and auxiliary forces
Dili Police Corps (Corpo de Polícia de Dili)
Civil administration sepoys
Timorese militias and auxiliaries

Allied

Sparrow Force units

 HQ Sparrow Force
 2/40th Infantry Battalion
 2/2nd Independent Company
 2/1st Heavy Battery
 [A & C Troops, 79th Light Anti-Aircraft Battery], (British Royal Artillery)
 75th Light Aid Detachment
 2/1st Fortress Engineers
 2/1st Fortress Signals
 B Troop, 18th Anti-Tank Battery
 No.2 Section, 2/11th Field Company
 23rd Brigade Signals
 2/12th Field Ambulance
 22nd Dental Unit
 Australian Army Service Corps

Royal Netherlands East Indies Army (KNIL) units
 Timor and Dependencies Garrison Battalion
 3rd Company, VIII Infantry Battalion
 Reservekorps (RK) Infantry Company
 Machine-Gun Platoon, XIII Infantry Battalion
 Artillery battery (4 × 75 mm guns)
 Engineer platoon
 Engineer platoon
 Mobile auxiliary first aid platoon

Empire of Japan
228th Regimental Group
3rd Yokosuka Special Naval Landing Force (detachment)

References
MAGRO, A. J., Tropa e Aquartelamentos de Timor (Troops and Barracks of Timor), Lisbon, 1947

Portuguese Timor
South West Pacific theatre of World War II
Timor(1942-43)
Timor(1942-43)
Timor(1942-43)
Timor
Timor(1942-43)
Timor(1942-43)
Japanese occupation of the Dutch East Indies